Rachael Lynn Kramer (born March 15, 1998) is an American former professional volleyball player who played as a middle blocker for the United States women's national volleyball team and Italian professional team Megabox Vallefoglia.

Career

College

Kramer played for the Florida Gators. She helped her team to a runner-up finish in the 2017 NCAA tournament. The same year, she was named an AVCA Third-Team All-American and was named to the all-conference team.

She graduated with a bachelor's degree in marketing in August 2019 and graduated with her master's degree in international business in 2020.

Professional clubs

  Megabox Vallefoglia (2020–2021)

Kramer played her first professional contract with Megabox Vallefoglia for the 2020−2021 season.

USA National Team

In September 2021, Kramer was selected to represent the U.S. and played in the 2021 NORCECA Championships. She helped the team to a 4th-place finish and was named "Best Middle Blocker" of the tournament.

Kramer also represented the United States at the 2021 Pan-American Cup and won a bronze medal with the team. She had 4 kills and 2 blocks in the bronze medal match against Canada.

Awards and honors

Clubs

 2020–2021 Italian Cup Series A2 –  Bronze medal, with Megabox Vallefoglia
 2020–2021 Italian Series A2 League –  Silver medal, with Megabox Vallefoglia

College

2018, 2019 AVCA All-America Honorable Mention
2017, 2018, 2019, All-SEC
2018 AVCA All-America Honorable Mention
2018 AVCA All-Region
2017 AVCA All-America Third Team
2016 SEC All-Freshman Team

International

2021 NORCECA Championships – Best Middle Blocker

References

1998 births
Living people
Sportspeople from Phoenix, Arizona
Middle blockers
American women's volleyball players
Florida Gators women's volleyball players
American expatriate sportspeople in Italy
Expatriate volleyball players in Italy
University of Florida alumni